Mark Hilditch (born 20 August 1960 in Shaw and Crompton, Lancashire) is an English former footballer who played as a striker.

Hilditch started his professional career at Rochdale, making almost 200 league appearances for the club. He went on to play for Tranmere Rovers and Wigan Athletic before returning to Rochdale in 1990. He made just 16 appearances in his second spell at the club, and in 1992 he left the club to play for Buxton in non-league football.

He joined Mossley in 1993, where he was assistant manager for Steve Taylor. However, Hilditch played just twice without scoring before Taylor left the club by mutual consent.

Hilditch is currently assistant Centre Of Excellence manager and child protection officer at Oldham Athletic. He has two children, Nicola and Liam and is married to Dawn (née Diggle). Hilditch also played cricket for this local club Heyside in this youth. He is a lifelong fan of Oldham Athletic

References

External links
Mark Hilditch career stats
Profile at mossleyweb.com

1960 births
Living people
People from Shaw and Crompton
English footballers
Footballers from Oldham
Association football forwards
Rochdale A.F.C. players
Tranmere Rovers F.C. players
Altrincham F.C. players
Wigan Athletic F.C. players
Buxton F.C. players
Fleetwood Town F.C. players
Mossley A.F.C. players
Oldham Athletic A.F.C. non-playing staff